The I formation is one of the most common offensive formations in American football.  The I formation draws its name from the vertical (as viewed from the opposing endzone) alignment of quarterback, fullback, and running back, particularly when contrasted with the same players' alignments in the T formation.

The formation begins with the usual 5 offensive linemen (2 offensive tackles, 2 guards, and a center), the quarterback under center, and two backs in-line behind the quarterback.  The base variant adds a tight end to one side of the line and  two wide receivers, one at each end of the line.

History
The exact origin of the I formation is unclear.  Charles M. Hollister of Northwestern in 1900 is one source, as is Bob Zuppke in 1914.

Tom Nugent is credited with developing the I formation at Virginia Military Institute in 1950 as a replacement for the single-wing and an alternative to the T formation.  Don Coryell, before popularizing Air Coryell, was also a pioneer of the I and used it as a high school coach in Hawaii, at Wenatchee Valley College in 1955, and at Whittier College in 1957–1959.  In 1960, Coryell was an assistant coach under John McKay for the USC Trojans.  By 1962, McKay's Trojans won the national title with an offense built on the I. John Madden recalled going to an I formation clinic led by McKay. "We'd go to these clinics, and afterward, everyone would run up to talk to McKay", said Madden. "Coryell was there because he introduced [McKay]. I was thinking, 'If [McKay] learned from him, I'll go talk to [Coryell].' "

Tom Osborne, head coach at Nebraska for a quarter century, further popularized the formation in the early 1970s as offensive coordinator (under head coach Bob Devaney) with consecutive national titles in 1970 and 1971. He incorporated the option into his I formation scheme beginning in 1980, forming the base of the Nebraska offense for over twenty years, and won three national championships in the 1990s.  NFL teams followed the success of the I at the college level and adopted it as well.

Typical roles

The I formation is typically employed in running situations. In the I formation, the tailback starts six to eight yards behind the scrimmage from an upright position, where he can survey the defense. The formation gives the tailback more opportunities for finding weak points in the defense to run into.

The fullback typically fills a blocking, rather than rushing or receiving, role in the modern game.  With the fullback in the backfield as a blocker, runs can be made to either side of the line with his additional blocking support.  This is contrasted with the use of tight ends as blockers who, being set up at the end of the line, are able to support runs to one side of the line only.  The fullback can also be used as a feint—since the defense can spot him more easily than the running back, they may be drawn in his direction while the running back takes the ball the opposite way.

Despite the emphasis on the running game, the I formation remains an effective base for a passing attack.  The formation supports up to three wide receivers and many running backs serve as an additional receiving threat.  While the fullback is rarely a pass receiver, he serves as a capable additional pass blocker protecting the quarterback before the pass.  The running threat posed by the formation also lends itself to the play-action pass.  The flexible nature of the formation also helps prevent defenses from focusing their attention on either the run or pass.

Common variations

Many subtypes of the I formation exist, generally emphasizing the running or passing strengths of the base version.
The Big I places a tight end on each side of the offensive line (removing a wide receiver).  Coupled with the fullback's blocking, this allows two additional blockers for a run in either direction.  This is a running-emphasis variant.
The Power I replaces one wide receiver with a third back (fullback or running back) in the backfield, set up to one side of the fullback.  This is a running-emphasis variant.
The Jumbo or Goal-line formation further extends the Power I or Big I, adding a second tight end and/or third tackle to the line, respectively.  This variant has no wide receivers and is all but exclusively a running formation intended to reliably gain minimal yardage, most commonly two yards or less.
The Three-wide I replaces the tight end with a third wide receiver.  This is a passing-emphasis variant.
The Maryland I (also known as the Stack I or Golden I) is similar to the Power I except that instead of placing the third back to one side of the fullback, the fullback, third back, and tailback line up directly in front of each other (hence the term "Stack").  Obviously, this is a running-emphasis variant made popular by the Maryland Terrapins football team of the 1950s under Tom Nugent.
The Tight I is similar to the Maryland I except that the extra back (who happens to be the tight end) is aligned between the quarterback and fullback in the alignment.  The split end and the player who normally lines up as flanker are both aligned on the line of scrimmage split away from the end man on the line of scrimmage.  This formation was used by the Kansas City Chiefs in Super Bowl IV against the Minnesota Vikings so as to create confusion in the Minnesota defense's lining up against the Chiefs offense.

The I formation, in any variant, can also be modified as Strong or Weak. This formation is commonly called an Offset I.  In either case, the fullback lines up roughly a yard laterally to his usual position.  Strong refers to a move towards the TE side of the formation (Primary TE, or flanker's side when in a "big" 2TE set), weak in the opposite direction.  These modifications have little effect on expected play call. However, the Offset I allows a fullback to more easily avoid blockers and get out of the backfield to become a receiver.

In professional football

In the NFL, the I formation is less frequently used than in college, as the use of the fullback as a blocker has given way to formations with additional tight ends and wide receivers, who may be called on to block during running plays.  The increasingly common ace formation replaces the fullback with an additional receiver, who lines up along the line of scrimmage.  The I will typically be used in short-yardage and goal line situations. College football now has a spread football system, which in turn gets rid of the fullback. What spread formation can do is in a way "spread" the defense to cover the entire field.

See also

American football strategy

References

American football formations